IRIS² (Infrastructure for Resilience, Interconnectivity and Security by Satellite) is a planned multi-orbit satellite internet constellation to be deployed by the European Union by 2027.

It is intended to provide service to governmental agencies as well as commercial service to private entities. Its conception is a direct response to an increasing number of large satellite internet constellations outside of the control of the EU, such as Starlink or the forthcoming Kuiper project. The total budget for the project is projected at €2.4 billion, to be funded from the Multiannual Financial Framework 2021-2027.

In addition to its use for communications, there are also plans to use IRIS² for space surveillance, and to detect high-altitude spy balloons.

IRIS² is part of an overall EU space strategy that will include the forthcoming EU Space Strategy for Security and Defence.

History 

The project was first announced by the Council of the EU in November 2022. , the project is still in its planning stages.

References

See also 
 Galileo (satellite navigation), the EU's satellite navigation constellation

European Union and science and technology
Satellite constellations